Malmaison operates sixteen hotels in the United Kingdom. The company was established in 1994, and is now owned by Frasers Property.

History

Malmaison was founded by Scottish hotelier Ken McCulloch in 1994 in collaboration with hotel group Arcadian International. The first hotel opened in Leith, Edinburgh, with a second opening in Glasgow a month later. The chain is named after the Château de Malmaison on the outskirts of Paris, which inspired the design and style found within its hotels.

Malmaison owner MWB Group went into administration in November 2012. US private equity firm KSL Capital Partners purchased Malmaison for an estimated £180 million in March 2013. Under KSL ownership a hotel was opened in Dundee.

In May 2014 Malmaison stopped serving foie gras in their hotel restaurants, after a campaign by animal rights group PETA.

In January 2015, under guidance from investment bank UBS, KSL sought prospective buyers for Malmaison and the Hotel du Vin chain (HDV). Private equity firms Terra Firma Capital Partners and TDR Capital were identified by Sky News in March 2015 as being two of three bidders for the chain. Four months later, in June 2015, the chain along with Hotel du Vin was sold to Frasers Hospitality of Frasers Property Group for £363.4 million.

Hotels 

Malmaison hotels are mainly located in city centres. Each hotel typically has between 70 and 200 rooms, a bar and brasserie (branded as Chez Mal), private dining rooms and meeting rooms. Some hotels also have a champagne bar, a number have gyms and three have a spa.

The chain has sixteen hotels, fifteen of which are converted historic buildings, including a prison, a postal sorting office, a church and a building once used as a brothel. As of January 2017, Malmaison's only new-build hotel is located in Liverpool.

Malmaison was subject of protests in February 2017 when wedding fairs at their London and Liverpool hotels were targeted by trade union Unite. The union accused the hotel chain of low pay, long hours, unfair tipping practices, health and safety breaches and alleged management bullying. In response Malmaison stated that “It operates a fair, transparent policy regarding all aspects of remuneration. All employees, regardless of age requirements, are paid at least the National Living Wage. Additionally, it is the rule that 100% of the service charge received is paid out to food and beverage employees and any breach of this will be thoroughly investigated.”

Operational locations

Aberdeen 
Opened in 2008, Malmaison Aberdeen was formerly the category C listed Queen’s Hotel which was converted and extended at a cost of £7 million under the direction of London-based Curious Architecture. It is located on Queen’s Road in the west end of the city and features 79 bedrooms and suites, wine tasting cellar and whisky shop. The building is owned by Aberdeen Asset Management and let to Malmaison until 2046.

Belfast 

The 8th hotel in the chain to open, the Malmaison Belfast is located within a former seed warehouse dating from 1870 which overlooks Belfast Harbour. The hotel is on the corner of Victoria Street and Marlborough Street and features 62 rooms and suites.

Birmingham 
Located within The Mailbox, a shopping and dining centre in Birmingham city centre, the hotel is a converted Royal Mail sorting office. It opened in 2000 and has 192 rooms and suites over seven floors. It received a £500,000 refurbishment in 2015. The hotel has attracted a number of celebrity guests including Beyoncé, Prince and Katy Perry - some of whom have stayed in the "Penny Black" suite which features a home cinema and private spa room.

Brighton 
Frasers Hospitality Group purchased the 71 room Hotel Seattle in December 2015. In April 2016 it was announced the hotel, which overlooks Brighton Marina, would be re-branded as a Malmaison, becoming the 14th hotel in the chain. In 2017 ROL Group Ireland purchased the hotel for an undisclosed sum.

Cheltenham 
Cheltenham's Montpellier Chapter Hotel was purchased in December 2015 and it was announced in May 2016 that it would be re-branded as a Malmaison. The hotel is a three-storey former villa dating from 1847, which is grade II listed.

Dundee 
The Dundee Malmaison hotel opened in January 2014 at a cost of £15 million. The opening date was delayed by a week due to flooding within the building, resulting in bookings being cancelled, including a 170-seat dinner celebrating the 120th anniversary of Dundee Football Club. The building was formerly the Mathers Temperance Hotel and Tay Hotel and overlooks the Firth of Tay. It has 91 rooms and suites over four floors, each of which has a picture of cartoon character Dennis the Menace, who was created by Dundee-based publisher DC Thomson.

Edinburgh 
Built in 1883 and a former seaman’s mission and at one point a brothel, the Edinburgh Malmaison in Leith was the first hotel to open when Malmaison was established in 1994. It is a category B listed building overlooking Leith docks and has 100 rooms and suites.

Edinburgh City 
The 72 bedroom hotel opened in 2019 in St Andrew Square following a 20 month development project. The building which was previously home to Joseph Bell, the inspiration behind Sherlock Holmes also houses Chez Mal the brand's bar and brasserie concept.

Glasgow 
Opened in September 1994, a former Greek orthodox church on West George Street within the city centre, Malmaison Glasgow has 72 bedrooms and suites. 51 of these were part of the original hotel, with the remainder in a new wing created during an expansion of the hotel in 1997. The largest suite is known as "The Big Yin" in honour of Glaswegian comedian Billy Connolly.

Leeds 
Located within the Victorian era former Leeds City Tramways Office the hotel has 200 rooms and suites. A refurbishment of the hotel was completed in November 2015.

The hotel is frequented by musical performers and has historically been attended by bands such as Sum 41, Red Hot Chili Peppers and others, including those performing at the annual Leeds Festival.

Liverpool 
The first and only new-build hotel by Malmaison was designed by Leach Rhodes Walker architects and constructed by Morgan Sindall. The 11 storey building located at Prince's Dock opened in 2006 and has 130 rooms.

London 
Located in Farringdon, central London and previously a nurses home, the hotel has 97 rooms and suites. It opened in 2003 and underwent a refurbishment between March and November 2013.

Manchester 
Situated within the Piccadilly area of Manchester city centre, the hotel was previously a six-storey 19th-century warehouse. It has 180 rooms and suites and the restaurant is called Chez Mal. A sixty bedroom extension was opened in 2001 at a cost of £4 million, designed by Leach Rhodes Walker architects and built by BAM Construction.

In November 2014 images of male and female models on construction site hoardings at the hotel were condemned by the Construction Industry Training Board and writer and journalist Jeanette Winterson as being stereotypical and sexist. In response Malmaison insisted that the images were meant to be a bit of fun with both men and women depicted to highlight their construction project.

Newcastle upon Tyne 
The Newcastle hotel is within the grade II-listed former Co-Operative Society warehouse building dating from 1900. It is located on the Quayside and overlooks the Millennium Bridge between Newcastle and Gateshead. It originally opened in 1997 with 122 rooms and was refurbished in 2015 at a cost of £1.2 million.

Oxford 
HM Prison Oxford until 1996, the building was converted by Malmaison between 2003 and December 2005, as part of the wider Oxford Castle regeneration project. The 95 rooms are converted prison cells and the hotel retains several original features such as metal doors and walk-ways.

Reading 
Dating from 1844 and the oldest surviving railway station hotel in the world, the Reading hotel was bought by Malmaison in 2007. It has 75 rooms.

York 

Opened in October 2022 on Rougier Street, within the historic city walls and close to the railway station, it boasts 150 bedrooms and suites, with a new-build extension featuring the brand’s Work+Play facilities, with meeting pods, co-working space, conference rooms and an events area. The hotel has a new rooftop Sky Bar, Sora - an Asian fusion tapas and cocktail bar, Chez Mal Brasserie & Bar, a spa, gym and on-site Starbucks with an outdoor terrace.

The extensive redevelopment of a seven-storey Sixties landmark office building has been completed by Lothbury Property Trust. Previously known as Yorkshire House, it was occupied by Aviva as a headquarters for the insurance giant.

Proposed locations

Bournemouth 
It was announced in October 2017 that Malmaison would be opening a hotel within a £40 million development at Bath Road, Bournemouth. Construction was expected to take approximately 24 months and begin in early 2018. The intended opening date was later amended to 2022.

References

External links

Hotel chains in the United Kingdom
Hotel and leisure companies based in London